Joseph Karam is an American musician known for singing and playing keyboard/synth in The Locust. He used to be the drummer of the band Le Shok, and vocalist for hardcore straight edge band Resist. In 2010, he was a full-time member of The Locust and also played keyboards live with One Day As A Lion.

Karam and fellow The Locust member and drummer Gabe Serbian together formed the duo Skinwalker in 2010. He performed guest vocals and keyboards on the track "Total Gore?" and keyboards on the track "Of Human Pride and Flatulence" from Cattle Decapitation's 2006 album Karma. Bloody. Karma.

Karam plays an assortment of analog synthesizers, including various Moog models and a patch-panel modular synth.

Karam joined One Day as a Lion on keyboard. He was not on the band's only album (self-titled EP) but he joined for their live shows.

References

Year of birth missing (living people)
Living people
Place of birth missing (living people)
The Locust members
21st-century American keyboardists
American rock keyboardists
One Day as a Lion members